Huize Sevenaer (Huis Sevenaer, Huize Zevenaar or Huis Seventer) is a castle farm in Zevenaar, the Netherlands. The estate has existed since the 14th century and since 1947 has been the last remaining fully operational castle farm in the country, and one of the few remaining in Europe. The castle has been private property of the van Nispen family since 1785, and is owned and operated by Jonkheer Huub van Nispen van Sevenaer.

Agriculture
The castle grows all its own food for its cattle and is run solely on macrobiotic principles. Huub van Nispen in public interviews announced the importance of a country's self-sufficiency to grow its own food, especially during times of crisis. Van Nispen was strict against the use of pesticides. This estate has been solely organic since World War II and probably for centuries before that. Rare native plants grow on the estate. The farm is fond of companion planting and other principles now known as "permaculture" or "macrobiotic farming."

Early on as research by Dr. Grashuis made the link between certain diseases in cows and livestock and the use of artificial fertilizer. Van Nispen decided to bring the ground as well as the plants on it in a healthy balance. His thesis was that everything in nature has a place and when you can restore a balance in your local ecosystem you will have a healthy crop without the use of any chemicals, and consequently preventing diseases from anyone consuming those chemicals.

Studying insects such as lady bugs and where they fly to and from was one of the aspects of maintaining a healthy ecosystem. Bugs are beneficial, but not in large amounts. Knowing the proper function of each weed and bug is crucial in maintaining a healthy garden. Local farmers have often stopped by since they want to know why a herd of 50 Piëmontese never gets visits of a vet or get inoculated on a farm that does not even use artificial fertilizer.

World War II

During World War II the castle was damaged and a fire destroyed most of the top floor and tower. Thanks to a grant, some parts of the castle can now be partially restored. For the longest time the existence of the castle and farm has been threatened by city development, who did not see the value of this heritage. However, thanks to recent changes, the castle has again started with renovation.

Post World War II
The City Zevenaar has been attempting to prevent the health food farming since 1948 when they made a first attempt to disown the lands and property and sell it to cigarette company and other developers. The decades long lawsuit was led by his father, who was the mayor of Laren and then taken over the himself. Despite media efforts to preserve the landscape and cultural heritage, the Dutch government disowned a large portion of the lands. A Dutch paper - het Algemeen Dagblad - stated: "Company of healing produce forced to make way for factory making cancer inducing products." The family had lost a lot during the war and the countless lawsuits with the government, leaving no funds available to properly restore the castle from the damages during WWII. After years of fighting with local and national authorities for the existence of the farm and cultural heritage, finally a small group of people started to see the value of this Cultural Heritage and have donated funds to make a start restore the castle.

Cultural heritage
Mozart probably visited the castle as the family archives contained manuscripts from Mozart.  A concert titled "Muziek uit het Archief" (Music from the Archives) was performed on 30 September 2005. However, during World War II the castle was occupied by the German army. Many manuscripts and books from Huize Sevenaer and Huize Pannerden, a neighboring estate, were used as fill to repair roads. The archives have been in poor condition since soldiers used stacks of papers from the archives as insulation to sleep in between during the cold winters. Consequently it has been taken years to update and restore the family archives.

Rose Gardens
Most people who visited the castle in the 1950s and 1960s remember the beautiful rose gardens, with a rare and wonderfully scented rose called "Ophelia".

Visitors
The castle is open to the public for scheduled tours and they also have educational tours for children. Frequently, volunteers are selected to learn about their farming methods.

References

G. M. W. Ruitenberg (2005) "Inventaris van de archieven van de Familie van Nispen 14de- 20ste eeuw."  
www.geschiedenisgelderland.nl
Huis Sevenaer http://www.vannispen.info/node/2362
huis Seventer http://www.vannispen.info/huizen
"Adellijk erfgoed in verval", EénVandaag, Nederland 1, 25 October 2010 
http://www.landschapsbeheergelderland.nl/oral-history-verhalen/huis-sevenaer-jonkheer-huub-van-nispen-van-sevenaer-en-het-eeuwige-gevecht

Castles in Gelderland
Rijksmonuments in Gelderland
Buildings and structures in Zevenaar